Club de Fútbol Trival Valderas Alcorcón is a Spanish football team based in Alcorcón, in the Community of Madrid. Founded in 2004, it currently plays in Tercera División RFEF – Group 7, holding home matches at Estadio La Canaleja, with a 2,000-seat capacity.

History
In the year 2004, AP Tri-Val (founded in 1972) and Unión Deportiva de San José de Valderas (born the year before) merged to create Club de Fútbol Trival Valderas. It first reached national competition (Tercera División) five years later. The beginning of the new decade was difficult, as in the 2010-11 and 2011-12 seasons the club had to fight to stay and avoid falling into one of the relegation places in Tercera División. Finally it saved its place in the Spanish fourth tier both times.

Season to season

1 season in Segunda División B
11 seasons in Tercera División
1 season in Tercera División RFEF

Current squad

Honours
Tercera División: (1) 2013–14

Colours
Since the 2004 merger, team colours were white shirt, red shorts and green socks.

References

External links
Official website 
Futbolme team profile 
Club & stadium history 

Football clubs in the Community of Madrid
Association football clubs established in 2004
2004 establishments in Spain
Sport in Alcorcón